Rayk Schröder (born 25 December 1974 in East Berlin, East Germany) is a German former footballer. He spent four seasons in the Bundesliga with TSV 1860 Munich, F.C. Hansa Rostock and FC Energie Cottbus.

Career
Schröder began playing football for enterprise sports community	BSG KWO Berlin. He was then allowed to join the youth academy of football club and East German champion BFC Dynamo in 1984. Schröder made his first appearance with the first team of BFC Dynamo, then named FC Berlin, away against BSV Brandeburg on the 24th matchday on 6 March 1993. FC Berlin was coached by Jürgen Bogs at the time. Schröder made numerous appearances for FC Berlin in the 1993–94 NOFV-Oberliga Nord. He would then be a key player in the team in the 1994-95 Regionalliga Nordost. 

Schröder joined 1. FC Union  Berlin for the 1995–96 season. He played for one year in the Regionalliga Nord and transferred after that to Bundesliga club TSV 1860 Munich, making seven appearances in the 1996–97 season. As he did not play in the Bundesliga in the following season, he moved to second division club Energie Cottbus. In Cottbus, Schröder became a regular, making 60 appearances and scoring three goals. In the 1999–2000 season, he helped Cottbus to gain promotion to the Bundesliga. He then transferred to Hansa Rostock, where he made 49 appearances and scored three goals in two seasons. For the 2002–03 season, he returned to Energie Cottbus. When he only played in Cottbus' second team, he joined FC Carl Zeiss Jena, but the contract was dissolved in pre-season when Schröder had to end his playing career due to a knee injury.

References

External links
  
 
 Rayk Schröder at hansanews.de 
 Rayk Schröder at immerunioner.de 

1974 births
Living people
German footballers
Berliner FC Dynamo players
1. FC Union Berlin players
TSV 1860 Munich players
FC Energie Cottbus players
FC Hansa Rostock players
Bundesliga players
2. Bundesliga players
Association football defenders
People from East Berlin
Footballers from Berlin